Rudolph P. Matthee, best known as Rudi Matthee (born 1953), is John and Dorothy Munroe Distinguished Professor of History in the History Department at the University of Delaware, teaching Middle Eastern history and specializing in the history of early modern Iran. He received his PhD in 1991 from the University of California. Matthee is a member of the Association for the Study of Persianate Societies, for which he also functioned as president twice in 2003-2005 and 2009–2011. He is the author of numerous books and articles on Safavid and Qajar Iran.

Selected publications
A selection of Matthee's works:
 
 
 
 
 
 (Editor, with Beth Baron) Iran and Beyond: Essays in Middle Eastern History in Honor of Nikki R. Keddie, Mazda Publishers (Costa Mesa, CA), 2000.
 
 (Editor, with Nikki R. Keddie) Iran and the Surrounding World: Interactions in Culture and Cultural Politics, University of Washington Press (Seattle, WA), 2002.
 
 
 
 
 
 
 
 
 
 
 
 
 
 (Editor) The Safavid World , Routledge, 2021.

Awards
Matthee has been awarded numerous prizes for his oeuvre:
 Albert Hourani Book prize (2006). Awarded by the Middle East Association of North America
 Saidi Sirjani Award (2004-2005). Awarded by the International Society for Iranian Studies
 British-Kuwaiti Friendship Book Prize (2012)
 Best foreign-language book on Iran (twice, awarded by the Iranian Ministry of Culture)

References

External links
 Curriculum Vitae of Rudolph (Rudi) P. Matthee

Living people
1953 births
University of Delaware faculty
University of California alumni
Iranologists
20th-century American historians
21st-century American historians
Middle Eastern studies scholars
Historians of Iran